Laura Pigossi and Renata Zarazúa were the defending champions, but both players chose to participate in Barcelona instead.

Wildcards Elisabetta Cocciaretto and Nicoleta Dascălu won the title, defeating Carolina Alves and Elena Bogdan in the final, 7–5, 4–6, [10–7].

Seeds

Draw

Draw

References
Main Draw

Torneo Internazionale Femminile Antico Tiro a Volo - Doubles